The American Rental Association (ARA) is a nonprofit trade association representing the equipment rental and event rental segments in North America.

History and mission
The was first formed in 1955 by a group of twenty-one rental store operators. At the time, rental stores were a quickly growing industry. The ARA represents over 11,000 member locations in North America.

Structure
ARA, like most trade associations, uses working committees and short term task forces.

Members 
General members at ARA are rental companies who focus substantially on the rental of owned assets to consumers in North America.

Exhibitions and events
The ARA organizes and hosts The ARA Show annually. It is the 63rd largest trade show in the North America and the largest rental trade show in the world.

References

1955 establishments in Illinois
Trade associations based in the United States
Non-profit organizations based in Illinois
Renting